Bion-M No.2 (Бион-М) is a planned Russian space mission, part of the Bion-M programme focused on space medicine. The new generation Bion-M continues the Soviet/Russian Bion satellite programme aimed at biological research in space. The most recent spacecraft of the Bion-M series, Bion-M No.1, was launched in 2013. The Bion-M spacecraft are designed to carry biological, physiological and biotechnological experiments to low Earth orbit and return them to Earth at the end of the mission.

Satellite description 
The satellite has components from two long-standing Soviet spy satellite families. Bion's landing unit is from the Zenit 2M satellite and the satellite also carries an instrument section developed for the Yantar satellite. The satellite was made by TsSKB Progress of Samara, Russia.

Launch 
The animal-carrying space capsule will be launched into orbit in 2024, by a Soyuz-2.1b launch vehicle from Baikonur Cosmodrome, Kazakhstan.

See also 

 2023 in spaceflight
 Effect of spaceflight on the human body

References 

Bion satellites
2023 in spaceflight
2023 in Russia
Spacecraft launched by Soyuz-2 rockets